Shallow water marine environment refers to the area between the shore and deeper water, such as a reef wall or a shelf break. This environment is characterized by oceanic, geological and biological conditions, as described below. The water in this environment is shallow and clear, allowing the formation of different sedimentary structures, carbonate rocks, coral reefs, and allowing certain organisms to survive and become fossils.

Sediment

The sediment itself is often composed of limestone, which forms readily in shallow, warm calm waters. The shallow marine environments are not exclusively composed of siliciclastic or carbonaceous sediments. While they cannot always coexist, it is possible to have a shallow marine environment composed solely of carbonaceous sediment or one that is composed completely of siliciclastic sediment. Shallow water marine sediment is made up of larger grain sizes because smaller grains have been washed out to deeper water. Within sedimentary rocks composed of carbonaceous sediment, there may also be evaporite minerals. The most common evaporite minerals found within modern and ancient deposits are gypsum, anhydrite, and halite; they can occur as crystalline layers, isolated crystals or clusters of crystals.

In terms of geologic time, it is said that most Phanerozoic sedimentary rock was deposited in shallow marine environments as about 75% of the sedimentary carapace is made up of shallow marine sediments; it is then assumed that Precambrian sedimentary rocks were too, deposited in shallow marine waters, unless it is specifically identified otherwise. This trend is seen in the North American and Caribbean region. Also, as a result of supercontinent breakup and other shifting tectonic plate processes, shallow marine sediment displays large variations in terms of quantity in the geologic time.

Sedimentary Structures
Various types of structures form in shallow marine environments. For example, Graded-bedding, which occurs when beds have vertical gradation in grain size, with the smallest grains at the top. Also, Ripples, which are the smallest bedform type, and dunes, which are similar to ripples except are larger.

Carbonaceous sedimentary rocks with several kinds of sedimentary structures within them can be found in shallow marine environments; they are a group of rocks that have a significant amount of non-skeletal matter along with siliciclastic or chemical constituents. Some examples include:

Cross stratification is a layering structure found in gravel, sand, and coarse silt-sized sediment; the strata are distinct layers of sediment that are steeply inclined to the underlying surfaces of the deposit.

Desiccation cracks are cracks formed due to drying out of newly deposited mud; these form in sub-aerial climates.

Syneresis cracks are cracks in mud formed by mechanisms other than sub-aerial climate exposure. These mechanisms include Contraction caused by the clumping of settled clay sediment, contraction due to the deposition/compaction of a settling clay layer during faulting, compaction of smectitic clay because of lost interlayer water due to a change in salinity in surrounding water, compaction dewatering under sediment causing injection from below or collapsing from above, and tensional openings due to down-sloping of a surface mud layer.

Fenestrae is an open or partially filled space occupied by different sediment or cement in the rock.

Flame structures is mud shaped like flames that intrude the overlying layer of rock.

Convolute folds are complicated folds in beds into irregular anticlines and/or synclines.

Flutes are outstretched ridges that are rounded at one end and flared at the other.

Groove casts are outstretched, almost straight grooves in sediment caused by the dragging of an object such as a rock, piece of wood, etc.

Chevron structures are a type of groove cast that is v-shaped as a result of two or more stress directions; they occur on the bottoms of beds deposited in shallow water environments.

Water composition
The water in this environment is mostly clear and shallow. It is said that if shallow marine environments can be defined by their distributional patterns of marine organisms in terms of temperature, then deductions can be made from that of the past patterns in terms of paleolithic zones. Today, there are 3 major defining criteria used in defining shallow marine environments, these are The faunal provinces, the faunal elements, and the degree of latitude. However, the limits of different present-day shallow marine environments in terms of climatic zones are seldom agreed on.

Also, many shallow marine environments are often associated with carbonate factory zones. In these zones, processes that remove the CO₂ from water to cause the bicarbonate ions to change into carbonate ions are important and support lime precipitation. Increasing temperature, intense evaporation, and mixing water that is high in CO₃ and low in calcium cations with seawater are some examples of processes that change bicarbonate ions to carbonate ions. Carbon dioxide is removed from the atmosphere by being dissolved in water and is turned into carbonic acid. The carbonic acid then weathers rocks, creating bicarbonate and other ions. Then the calcium carbonate is a precipitate from calcium and the bicarbonate ions that formed through organisms like coral, and then the carbon is stored in layers of limestone on the seafloor. In terms of geologic time, the composition of limestone has changed from calcite rich limestone to aragonite rich limestone. The presence of magnesium ions at certain concentrations inhibits the ability to precipitate calcite. Aragonite, however, has the same chemical formula as calcite but it is in a different crystal system that is much less prone to the magnesium preventing the precipitation of this mineral, which would prevent it from forming carbonate rocks. At times in geologic history where the Mg and Ca ratio were different, and the seas were more abundant in calcite and this was as a result of the high rates of seafloor spreading because of tectonic plate movement and action. The more spreading, the more the Magnesium gets removed, so more calcite is precipitated, and calcite will be more abundant than aragonite.

Organisms

Some organisms in this environment, specifically those in the intertidal zone, are starfish, sea anemones, sponges, marine worms, clams, mussels, predatory crustaceans, barnacles and small fish. Hydrozoa, or hydroids, also live in shallow marine ecosystems and eat surrounding algae and zooplankton. Some species of isopods and amphipods are found in the intertidal zones and create several different burrows and surface tracks in the sediment. Brittle stars have been seen buried in sediment with their arms showing through the sediment; this behaviour has been noted in several shallow marine areas.

As well, carbonate reefs can be found in the depositional environment that is shallow marine areas; they are host to reefs and organisms that reside in reefs. Recent estimates regarding the numbers of species on coral reefs range from 1–9 million. There are 3 main types of reef formations: fringing reefs, these reefs are attached to the shore, barrier reefs, which are separated from mainland by a lagoon, and atoll reefs. Organisms that live in this environment include red algae, green algae, bivalves and echinoderms. Many of these organisms contribute to the formation of reefs. Also, unicellular dinoflagellates live in the tissues of corals, and have a mutualistic relationship in which the dinoflagellates provide the corals with organic molecules.

Fossils      

The vast majority of the fossil record has been found after the shallow water marine environment has been lithified. Many of these fossils were deposited at times when much of Earth was covered with shallow seas, supporting a wide variety of organisms.

Several fossils can be found/formed in this environment. Some examples include:

Skolithos Ichnofacies are trace fossils that are vertical, cylindrical or U-shaped burrows created by organisms for protection.

Glossifungites ichnofacies are trace fossils that are vertical, cylindrical, U or tear-shaped borings or burrows created by organisms like shrimp, crabs, worms and bivalves.

Stromatolites are fossils that are laminated sedimentary structures that form when cyanobacteria form microbial mats which then trap clay and/or silt sediment and organic materials to form the fossil.

See also
 Tides in marginal seas

References

External links
 Example of marine fossil - Burgess Shale

Oceans